"All or Nothing" is a song by German dance-pop group Milli Vanilli. It was released in 1989 and was their final top 10 single, peaking at number four in the United States. This was their final single before the lip syncing scandal. In November 1990, the duo's manager, Frank Farian, publicly announced that he had fired Fab Morvan and Rob Pilatus. He also confirmed long standing rumors that Morvan and Pilatus did not actually sing on any Milli Vanilli releases. Session singers had provided the lead vocals while Morvan and Pilatus lip synced to the recorded tracks when performing live.

In December 1990, singer-songwriter David Clayton-Thomas sued Milli Vanilli for copyright infringement, alleging that "All or Nothing" used the melody from his 1968 song "Spinning Wheel", a hit for his group Blood, Sweat & Tears.

Charts

Weekly charts

Year-end charts

References

1988 songs
1990 singles
Arista Records singles
Hansa Records singles
Milli Vanilli songs
Number-one singles in New Zealand
Song recordings produced by Frank Farian
Songs written by Frank Farian